The crucifix position is a ground grappling position that involves being perpendicularly behind the opponent, chest against back, and controlling the opponent's arms. One of the opponent's arms is controlled using the legs, and the other using the arms, hence effectively putting the opponent in a position resembling a crucifix. This position allows for elbow strikes to the head, or if the opponent is wearing a gi, it allows for a collar strangle called the crucifix choke (in Judo known as jigoku jime, 地獄絞, "hell strangle"). It is also possible to have the crucifix position in such a way that a crucifix neck crank can be applied.

References

 Gracie Barra Tampa. A Confusion of Crucifixes, Crucifix Choke. tampabjj.com. accessed February 11, 2006.

External links
 The Crucifix. Shows the basic crucifix position.
 Crucifix. Shows the crucifix position being used to set up a crucifix neck crank.
 Chris Kirby and Chris Russo demonstrating completed jigoku jime (hell strangle)

 

Grappling positions
Wrestling
Chokeholds